Cadent can refer to:
Cadent, "referring to cadence"
Cadent (heraldry), an attitude on a blazon
Cadent Gas, a British regional gas distribution company based in Coventry